The Ukrainian shipbuilding industry began to develop in times of the Cossacks.

History

Cossacks Times

The most popular ships built were gulls and large single mast ships. As the sea was controlled by the Ottoman Empire, shipbuilding was developed near the Dnipro river, where wood - the main material for shipbuilding at the time - was readily available.

To build a Cossack gull took approximately 2 weeks, utilizing the labour of around 60 people. The bottom of ships was made of willow or linden. The vessels' hulls were made from oak planks. On the fore and aft, they built cabins to store provisions, ammunition and weapons. At the centre of the deck the mast was fixed with sails; on both sides of the boat were between 20 and 40 oars. These ships were very maneuverable. The length of the boat was between 15 and 22 meters, the height was about 4 meters, and the width - 6 meters. The boat could hold between 40-60 Cossacks.

Pre-Soviet Period

In Ukraine, the first shipyard for the construction of warships was built in 1788 in Mykolaiv. In 1862 in Kyiv based building company, which later turned into a shipyard. In the years 1895-1897 were built two shipyards in Mykolaiv. In Ukraine, there were seven shipbuilding and ship-repair enterprises in 1913 (in Mykolaiv, Kherson, Odessa, etc.).
Shipbuilding in Ukraine was developed in the 1920-30-s; from 1928 till 1929 it was producing 14% of total engineering production and its weight increased in the USSR. Also, there were built many new factories and old factories were reconstructed.

After the World War II there was a second rebuilding and reconstruction of destroyed factories and building new ones.

Soviet period

In the Ukrainian Soviet Socialist Republic major shipbuilding companies were located in Mykolaiv, Odessa, Kherson, Kyiv; smaller companies were located in Sevastopol, Zhdanov, Kerch; outside the Ukrainian Soviet Socialist Republic - in Tahanrih, Novorossiysk, Tuapse; river ship repair companies in Zaporizhia, Dnipro, Kiliya, Pinsk and others. The largest plants are Black Sea Shipyard in Mykolaiv, Kherson Shipyard and Kuznya na Rybalskomu in Kyiv. Black Sea Shipyard was formed in 1907 as a result of combining the two shipyards. This shipyard produces ocean vessels, tankers, and dry cargo vessels. Also, by 1914 it was built the first world underwater barrage "Crab" and the first one in the Russian Empire turbine destroyers. From 1957 to 1961 were built whaling bases "Soviet Ukraine" and "Soviet Russia" with a displacement of more than 20000 tons. Kherson Shipyard was built from 1951 to 1953. This Shipyard produces ocean vessels, riverboats, ships, etc. Kuznya na Rybalskomu Plant was founded in 1862, as an engineering enterprise, but in 1913 was turned into a shipyard. Kuznya na Rybalskomu produces river vessels, sea fishing trawlers and others.

Shipbuilding statistics in the USSR are not published. Also, there is no information about the structure of military ships on Ukrainian shipyards. There is an assumption, that by 1941, Ukraine was producing 15-20 military ships on factories. By 1914, Ukrainian shipbuilding was producing mainly military vessels.

Independent Ukraine
Nowadays different types of vessels are building in Ukraine including dry cargo , bulk tankers, whaling base, freezing fishing trawlers, receiving and transport, reefer timber, for seismic search, passenger hydrofoils, etc. The structure of military vehicles significantly increased. There are many shiprepair companies.

In the first part of 2002 shipbuilding companies of Ukraine produced products worth ₴270 million. The improvement of the situation in the shipbuilding industry is largely due to its restructuring. In joint stock society transformed the vast majority of companies. The non-core companies were separated from plants and turned into independent economic entities. The factories have lost the social sphere, requiring large expenditures for maintenance.

The favorable factor was the cooperation of a number of Ukrainian factories, established the cooperation with the European shipbuilding companies, the hulls were producing in Ukraine and the completion of their construction was finished in Europe. Due to this scheme of order, the construction of various types of hull now have "Damen Shipyards Okean", shipbuilding plant "Zalyv" (Kerch), Kuznya na Rybalskomu Plant (Kyiv shipbuilding and repair plant).

However, many problems still remain. A number of companies continue the construction of vessels previously entered into unprofitable contracts. Plants are experiencing enormous difficulties in obtaining loans for modernization, lack of working capital, with loading capacities.

In 2006 in Ukraine shipbuilding companies produced products worth ₴2,303 million. The volume of manufactured products increased by 11% compared to 2005. In 2007, 42 vehicles were ordered in the amount of 248 million dollars.

Between 2000 and 2006 there have been positive trends in shipbuilding of Ukraine.

Media constantly write about events in the shipbuilding and ship-repairing industries.

Types of companies

By type of work performed enterprises are divided into the following types:

 Shipbuilding companies are receiving ready modules of ships, which produced in other enterprises. They are engaged by assembly and installation of modules in their docks.
 Shipyards are more advanced production, including the assembly departments and departments for processing buildings. The enterprises of this type have a variety of equipment for metal processing, electrical installation equipment, etc., which allows to concentrate the production process of vessels on one platform. The shipyard constructs hulls and imbues them, and also carries out the installation of mechanisms and equipment, which are received from counterparties.
Shipyards - companies, that include in their membership shipyard and engineering departments. Shipyards except vessels also produce engineering products.

Shipbuilding and ship repair yards
 Kuznya na Rybalskomu (Kyiv)
 Zaporizhia Shipbuilding-Shiprepair Plant (Zaporizhia)
 Azov Shiprepair Plant (Mariupol)
 Mariupol Shipyard (Mariupol)
 Black Sea Shipyard (Mykolaiv)
 Mykolayiv Shipyard (Mykolaiv)
 Okean Shipyard (Mykolaiv)
 Nibulon Shipbuilding-Shiprepair Plant
 Kherson Shipyard (Kherson)
  (Kherson)

The following shipyards are located in Crimea and are following the 2014 Russian annexation of Crimea not controlled by Ukraine:
 Sevastopol Shipyard (Sevastopol)
 Zalyv Shipbuilding yard (Kerch) 
 More Shipbuilding Yard (Feodosiya)

Design companies
 State Research and Design Shipbuilding Center (Mykolaiv)
 Zaliv Ship Design (Mykolaiv)

Engine manufacturers
 Zoria-Mashproekt (Mykolaiv)

Export potential

Ukrainian shipbuilding industry has great export potential, which affects the development of the national economy. At the same time in Ukraine due to lack of funding, there is a lack of relevant research, the lack of coordinated cooperation of research and design organizations and enterprises. Its negative impact on the competitiveness and quality of products produced by domestic enterprises.

See also
 List of shipyards of the Soviet Union

References

Links 
 http://shipbuilding.mk.ua/?lang=uk
 http://sudostroy.com/

Ukraine
Economy of Ukraine